Vietnam Magazine is a full-color history magazine published bi-monthly which covers the Vietnam War. It was founded in 1988 by the late Colonel Harry G. Summers, Jr. Colonel Summers served in the U.S. Army in both Korea and Vietnam, where he was twice wounded and decorated for valor. The current editor is David T. Zabecki, a major general in the U.S. Army Reserve and currently the Deputy Chief of Staff for Mobilization and Reserve Affairs for U.S. Army Europe.

Contributors to Vietnam  include journalists, military historians, political analysts and the commanders and men who served. Many articles are first-person accounts of combat operations, including personal interviews with enlisted men and officers, and specs on units and weaponry.

Some notable contributors to Vietnam include:

 Major General Huỳnh Văn Cao, commander of the Army of the Republic of Vietnam 7th Division
 Colonel David H. Hackworth, Vietnam veteran and prominent military journalist
 General Nguyen Duc Huy, commander of the NVA 351st Division 
 Senator John McCain, retired U.S. Navy aviator and senator from Arizona
 Oliver Stone, Vietnam veteran and director of Platoon and Born on the Fourth of July
 General William Westmoreland, Commander U.S. Military Assistance Command, Vietnam

Vietnam is published in Leesburg, Virginia, by the Weider History Group, along with the publications America's Civil War and Civil War Times.

Vietnam has a number of recurring departments, including:

Personality – Study of an individual person in the Vietnam War

Arsenal – Profiles on the armament, artillery, armor and supplies used in the war

Fighting Forces – Study of an individual unit in the war

Perspectives – First-hand accounts of experiences in the Vietnam War

External links
Vietnam Magazine official website

Bimonthly magazines published in the United States
History magazines published in the United States
Military magazines published in the United States
Magazines established in 1988
Vietnam War and the media
Magazines published in Virginia